Lac des Écorces or Lac-des-Écorces (French for "Bark Lake") can refer to the following places, all in Quebec, Canada:

 Lac des Écorces (Antoine-Labelle), lake
 Lac des Écorces (Les Laurentides), lake in Barkmere
 Lac-des-Écorces, Quebec, municipality
 Lac-des-Écorces, Quebec (former unorganized territory)

See also
 Lac aux Écorces